Almaty 2022 was an unsuccessful bid for the 2022 Winter Olympics by the city of Almaty and the National Olympic Committee of the Republic of Kazakhstan. The IOC selected the host city for the 2022 Winter Olympics at the 128th IOC Session in Kuala Lumpur, Malaysia on July 31, 2015, in which Beijing won. Under the slogan “Keeping it Real,” Almaty had emphasized their traditional winter setting with tall mountains and plenty of natural snow coverage as well as compactness — most venues are within half an hour’s travel through Alpine scenery.
Almaty was the only contender to have never hosted the Olympics before. Almaty previously hosted the 2017 Winter Universiade.

History

On 29 November 2011, Almaty was chosen to host the 2017 Winter Universiade. The city also co-hosted the 2011 Asian Winter Games with Astana, the capital since 1997. It can be seen as preparation for hosting the Winter Olympic Games in the future.

Kazakhstan had been considering a bid for these games since 2011. On 17 August 2013, Almaty, the former capital city and still the largest city and financial centre of the country, confirmed their bid for the 2022 Winter Olympic Games. They were the first city to do so.

Previous bids

Almaty bid to host the 2014 Winter Olympics but failed to become a candidate city. Sochi was ultimately elected at the host city on July 4, 2007.
Almaty bid to host the 2022 Winter Olympic Games, but lost to previous host city Beijing.

Venues
The venue plan comprises:

City venues

Olympic City 
Almaty Olympic Ice Arena - Figure skating, short track
Non-competitive venues: Olympic Village, Main Press Centre, International Broadcast Centre, Media Village, Olympic Family Accommodations

Central Cluster
Almaty Central Stadium - Opening and closing ceremonies
Baluan Sholak Sports Palace - Ice hockey (women)
Independence Square - Medal ceremonies

Sunkar Precinct
Sunkar Jumping Hills - Ski jumping, Nordic combined
Sunkar Skiing Centre - Nordic combined
Sunkar Sliding Centre - Bobsleigh, luge, skeleton

Stand-alone venues 
Almaty Ice Palace - Ice hockey (men)
Curling Arena - Curling

Mountain venues

Ak–Bulak Cluster
Ak Bulak Nordic Arena - cross country, biathlon
Non-competitive venues: Olympic Village

Medeo Cluster
Medeo Skating Oval - speed skating
Shymbulak ski resort - alpine skiing (downhill, super g, super combined)
Tau Park Snowboard Freestyle - freestyle (ski-cross, slopestyle), snowboarding (parallel slalom, parallel giant slalom, snowboard cross, slopestyle)
Non-competitive venues: Olympic Village, Mountain Media Sub Centre

Tabagan Cluster
Tabagan Ski Park - freestyle (aerial, mogul, half-pipe), snowboarding (half-pipe)
Tau Park Alpine - alpine skiing (slalom, giant slalom)

References

External links
Official website
Almaty 2022 Candidature File

2022 Winter Olympics bids
Sport in Almaty
Kazakhstan at the Olympics